Bertrand Bonello (born 11 September 1968) is a French film director, screenwriter, producer and composer. His background is in classical music, and he lives between Paris and Montreal. His work has also been associated with the New French Extremity.

Career
His directorial debut The Pornographer won the FIPRESCI prize at the 2001 Cannes Film Festival. His next effort Tiresia was nominated for the Palme d'Or at the 2003 Cannes Film Festival.

His film House of Tolerance, a depiction of daily life in a fin-de-siècle Parisian bordello, premiered In Competition at the 2011 Cannes Film Festival.

His 2014 film Saint Laurent, a biopic of fashion designer Yves Saint Laurent, competed for the Palme d'Or in the main competition section at the 2014 Cannes Film Festival, and received ten César Award nominations, including Best Film and Best Director. The film was also selected as France's submission for the Academy Award for Best Foreign Language Film at the 87th Academy Awards.

His 2022 film Coma competed for the Encounters Award at the 72nd Berlin International Film Festival and won the FIPRESCI Award at the festival.

His forthcoming film, The Beast, is a Sci-Fi romantic drama freely inspired by Henry James' 1903 novella The Beast in the Jungle, and it is expected to be released in 2023.

Bonello also owns the production company My New Picture, which produces all of his films since 2008's On War.

Personal life
Bonello was in a relationship with his frequent collaborator, French-Canadian cinematographer Josée Deshaies, with whom he had a daughter in 2003. Bonello's 2022 film Coma was dedicated to and inspired by his daughter.

Filmography

Acting roles

Awards and nominations 
Berlin Film Festival

Brussels International Film Festival

Cannes Film Festival

César Awards

Lumières Awards

Miami Film Festival

Palm Springs International Film Festival

Prix Henri-Langlois

Prix Louis-Delluc

Toronto Film Festival

Decorations 
 Chevalier of the Order of Arts and Letters (2015)

References

Further reading 
 Bernard Stiegler, "Tirésias et la guerre du temps: Autour d'un film de Bertrand Bonello," De la misère symbolique: Tome 1. L'époque hyperindustrielle (Paris: Galilée, 2004): 163–85.

External links 

 
 Bertrand Bonello on UniFrance
 Bertrand Bonello on AlloCiné
 Bertrand Bonello on Cineuropa

1968 births
Living people
French film directors
People from Nice
French male screenwriters
French screenwriters
French film producers
French composers
French male composers
French male film actors
21st-century French male actors
Chevaliers of the Ordre des Arts et des Lettres
French-language film directors